Sugarelly, or Liquorice water, is a traditional British soft drink made with liquorice that was popular in the early to mid-20th century.

It could not usually be bought as such, but instead was prepared by leaving several strands of liquorice to diffuse in water for a period of time before drinking. This tradition seems to have been well known throughout Britain. It is mentioned in many of Richmal Crompton's "William" series, Pip makes it in his room in Great Expectations and the Scottish cartoon "Oor Wullie" also makes mention of it. 

Traditionally, this drink was made with "chemist's liquorice", a hard, black liquorice stick cut into sections and dropped into a bottle of cold water. This was left in a cool, dark place for a week or so. Once infused, the liquorice water could be enjoyed by shaking the bottle and sucking the brown foam from its neck.

The world's most renowned connoisseurs of sugarelly are Evelyn and Mary McNeil of Nairn, who created such wonderful concontions of the drink as children in wartime Britain in their hometown of Nairn, Highland, Scotland that became the stuff of legend.

External links
A guide to making Sugarelly

British soft drinks
Cocktails with liquorice